The 1999 European Curling Championships were held in Chamonix, France December 4–11.

Men's

A Tournament

Group A

Draw 1

Draw 2

Draw 3

Draw 4

Draw 5

Group B

Draw 1

Draw 2

Draw 3

Draw 4

Draw 5

B Tournament

Challenge Games
Winning teams advance to Quarterfinals

Playoffs

Quarterfinals

Semifinals

Bronze-medal game

Gold-medal game

Medals

Women's

Group A

Group B

Playoffs

Medals

References
Men: 
Women: 

Curling Championships
European Curling Championships
European Curling Championships, 1999
1999 in European sport
International curling competitions hosted by France
Sport in Chamonix
December 1999 sports events in Europe